is a Japanese comedian and actor. He is represented with Yoshimoto Creative Agency of Yoshimoto Kogyo in Tokyo. He graduated from the Yoshimoto New Star Creation (NSC) in Osaka.

Kobayashi graduated from Osaka Municipal Higashitanabe Elementary School, Osaka Municipal Nakano Junior High School, and Hatsushiba Tondabayashi High School. He served as a captain of the rugby club during high school.

Filmography

Informal and variety series
Current appearances

Special programmes

Occasional appearances

Former appearances

Other appearances

Documentaries

TV drama

Anime television

Radio
Current appearances

Former appearances

Other appearances

Films

Dubbing

Anime films

Advertisements

Video games

Internet series
Current appearances'

Former appearances

Newspaper serializations

Magazine serializations

Solo shows

Bibliography

Publications

References

External links

Japanese comedians
Japanese radio personalities
Japanese television presenters
Japanese male voice actors
1972 births
Living people
People from Osaka